The women's 800 metres event at the 1985 Summer Universiade was held at the Kobe Universiade Memorial Stadium in Kobe on 2 and 3 September 1985.

Medalists

Results

Heats

Final

References

Athletics at the 1985 Summer Universiade
1985